Thomas Due (born 14 March 1971) is a Norwegian curler.

Thomas Due is a Norwegian business man and former curling player. He was part of the Norwegian National Curling team since he was a junior. Altogether he holds 6 Norwegian Championship Gold Medals. The last one in 2007 after winning 11 straight games during the Norwegian Championships in Skien, Norway.

 Norwegian Championship Gold:  1998, 2000, 2003, 2004, 2006, 2007
 In his first World Junior Curling Championships, playing with skip Thomas Ulsrud he got a bronze medal in 1988. He played two more WJCC in 1991 and 1992 where he skipped his own team.
 In 1997, he curled in his first European Curling Championships where his team finished in seventh. He returned in 2000, 2002 2003 and 2006 - winning bronze in 2002.
 In 1998 Thomas Due curled in his first World Curling Championships in Kamloops, Canada - to a 5th-place finish. At the 2006 World Men's Curling Championship, he made the playoffs for the first time, and defeated team USA to win the bronze medal. At the 2007 world curling championships in Edmonton, Canada the Norwegian team finished in 7th place.

Team mates up until 2007
Thomas Ulsrud (skip)
Torger Nergård (third)
Thomas Due (second)
Jan Thoresen (lead)
Christoffer Svae (alternate)
Johan Hoestmaelingen(alternate)

Team mates 2007 - 2008
 In 2007 Thomas Due played with Jan Thoresen, Tormod Andreasen and Kjell Berg. The team played on the World Curling Tour Europe.
Tormod Andreasen (skip)
Thomas Due (third)
Kjell Berg (second)
Jan Thoresen (lead)

Team mates 2008 - 2009
 In 2008 Thomas Due started a new team together with Oystein and Hallvard Soerum, Magnus Nedregotten and Sander Roelvaag. The team played on the World Curling Tour Europe.
Øystein Sørum (skip)
Thomas Due (third)
Hallvard Sørum (second)
Magnus Nedregotten (lead)
Sander Rølvaag (lead)

References

External links
 

1971 births
Living people
Norwegian male curlers